NWA Big Time Wrestling (BTW; Later known as World Class Championship Wrestling), based out of Dallas, Texas held their first major professional wrestling super shows under the name Wrestling Star Wars in 1981, an event series that would run until 1989, with at least three of these being held in 1981. Promoter Fritz Von Erich held two "Wrestling Star Wars" events, one in June and one in October as well as a special "Christmas Star Wars" on December 25 of that year.

Wrestling Star Wars (June)

Wrestling Star Wars (June 1981) was a professional wrestling supercard show that was held on June 4, 1981. The show was produced and scripted by the Dallas, Texas based Big Time Wrestling (BTW) professional wrestling promotion and held in their home area, the Dallas, Texas. Several matches from the show were taped for BTW's television shows and broadcast in the weeks following the show. It is believed that the June 4, 1981 version of "Wrestling Star Wars" was the first  overall show in the "Wrestling Star Wars" event chronology. The show was held at the Reunion Arena.

Due to sparse records from 1981 the full show has not been found documented, only three matches on the show have been verified. Kerry Von Erich defeated Ernie Ladd to win the NWA American Heavyweight Championship on the show. As of May 2019, all known matches are available as Hidden Gems on the WWE Network.

Results

Wrestling Star Wars (October)

Wrestling Star Wars (October 1981) was a professional wrestling supercard show that was held on October 25, 1981. The show was produced and scripted by the Dallas, Texas based Big Time Wrestling (BTW) professional wrestling promotion and held in their home area, the Dallas, Texas. Several matches from the show were taped for BTW's television shows and broadcast in the weeks following the show. Records are not clear on if this show was the second or third overall show in the "Wrestling Star Wars" event chronology. The show was held at the Reunion Arena.

Big Time Wrestling promoter Fritz Von Erich's son Kevin Von Erich was supposed to team up with Kerry Von Erich on the show, but had to be replaced at the last moment by Terry Orndorff. Kerry Von Erich and Orndorff would go on to defeat the team of the Great Kabuki and Chan Chung to win the NWA American Tag Team Championship.

Results

Christmas Star Wars

Christmas Star Wars (1981) was a professional wrestling supercard show that was held on December 25, 1981 The show was produced and scripted by the Dallas, Texas based Big Time Wrestling (BTW) professional wrestling promotion and held in their home area, the Dallas, Texas. Several matches from the show were taped for BTW's television shows and broadcast in the weeks following the show. The show was the third or fourth overall show in the "Wrestling Star Wars" event chronology. The show was held at the Reunion Arena. The show was the first show to be billed as "Christmas Star Wars", starting an annual tradition that would last until 1987.

For the show promoter Fritz Von Erich had brought in El Solitario from the Universal Wrestling Association (UWA) in Mexico to defend the UWA World Junior Light Heavyweight Championship as part of the show. Fritz himself wrestled one of his last high-profile matches of his career as he took on and lost to the Great Kabuki in a "Texas death" match where there were no disqualifications. The main event was a 14-man battle royal featuring wrestlers that had already competed once that night.

Results

References

1981 in professional wrestling
World Class Championship Wrestling shows
Events in Dallas
1981 in Texas
Professional wrestling in the Dallas–Fort Worth metroplex
June 1981 events in the United States
October 1981 events in the United States
December 1981 events in the United States